The World Ice Art Championships is an ice sculpting contest in Fairbanks, Alaska produced on by Ice Alaska, a non-profit corporation started in 1989. The contest is the largest of its kind in the world and attended by more than 100 sculptors from 30 countries every year. The contest also draws tens of thousands of spectators; in 2004, 48,000 people from more than 28 countries passed through the park's gates.

History

Ice Alaska put on its first ice art championship in 1991; it featured 16 sculpting teams and lasted a week. Today the event begins mid February and, weather permitting, lasts until the end of March, featuring the art and skill of as many as 75 teams from around the world. 

Locations:  Through 2011, the ice festival took place on a  site across the Chena River from Pioneer Park, which the organizers leased from the Alaska Railroad. In 2012 the event moved to a new location, the George Horner Ice Art Park. In 2017, after a fire destroyed their main lodge, the Ice Alaska organization restructured to protect the future of the event.  Then, in 2018 they reached an agreement with the Tanana Valley State Fair Association and moved the World Ice Art Championships, along with the associated Ice Alaska Ice Park, to the Tanana Valley State Fairgrounds.  

Ice Alaska has negotiated with a new property owner to harvest ice blocks and transport them to the new venue; the ice is so clear it is referred to as "arctic diamond". In addition to sculptures on view, the event features a Kids Park sculpted out of ice, including ice slides, an ice maze, an ice rink, and spinning cups.

Events

The championship is divided into three professional competitions, a youth event, and an amateur exhibition. abstract and realistic categories.

Single Block Classic
The Single Block Classic is open to 30 contestants.  (One Artist and One Block of Ice)  
Each Artist is provided one block of Ice 6’x4’x3’ (roughly 1,720 lbs) and 48 hours to create a sculpture.

Double Block Classic
The Double Block Classic is open to 25 Teams (2 Artists and 2 Blocks of Ice)  
Each Team is provided two blocks of Ice 6’x4’x3’ (roughly 3,440 lbs) and 72 hours to create a sculpture.

Multi-Block Classic
The Multi-Block Classic is open to 15 Teams (4 Artists with 9 Blocks of Ice) 
Each Team is provided 9 blocks of ice 6’x4’x3’ (roughly 15,490 lbs) and 132 hours to create a sculpture.

Youth Classic
This competition is held during the week of School Spring Break, usually the second week of March.  Is open to ~5 to 15 teams.  A Team is defined as 1 or 2 Carvers.  Available to students in grades 8th thru 12th  2’ x 3’ x 2-3’ block of ice.  The Youth Carvers have an opportunity to be mentored by Master Carvers who volunteer with the event to encourage the next generation of artisans.

Winners

See also
 Ice sculpture
 Winter festival

References
 Ice Alaska Website
 Alaska.net
 Fairbanks-Alaska.com

External links

 

Buildings and structures made of snow or ice
Carving
Non-profit organizations based in Fairbanks, Alaska
Outdoor sculptures in Alaska
Tourist attractions in Fairbanks North Star Borough, Alaska
Winter festivals in the United States
Ice in the United States
Recurring events established in 1991
1991 establishments in Alaska